The 2010 Australian Open Grand Prix was a badminton tournament which took place at the Melbourne Sports and Aquatic Centre in Melbourne, Australia on 13–18 July 2010 and had a total purse of $50,000.

Men's singles

Seeds

 Nguyễn Tiến Minh (champion)
 Joe Wu (third round)
 Alistair Casey (quarterfinals)
 Alamsyah Yunus (semifinals)

 James Eunson (third round)
 Yogendran Khrishnan (final)
 Raj Popat (third round)
 Harry Wright (third round)

Finals

Women's singles

Seeds

 Megumi Taruno (second round)
 Anita Raj Kaur (first round)
 Leanne Choo (second round)
 Karyn Velez (quarterfinals)

 Karen Foo Kune (first round)
 Lê Ngọc Nguyên Nhung (second round)
 Misaki Matsutomo (second round)
 Erica Pong (quarterfinals)

Finals

Men's doubles

Seeds

 Gan Teik Chai / Tan Bin Shen (semifinals)
 Oliver Leydon-Davis / Henry Tam (quarterfinals)

 Saliya Gunaratne / Chad Whitehead (semifinals)
 Ross Smith / Glenn Warfe (second round)

Finals

Women's doubles

Seeds

 Misaki Matsutomo / Ayaka Takahashi (quarterfinals)
 Danielle Barry / Donna Haliday (second round)

 Leanne Choo / Kate Wilson-Smith (second round)
 Leisha Cooper / Ann-Louise Slee (second round)

Finals

Mixed doubles

Seeds

 Henry Tam / Donna Haliday (second round)
 Raj Veeran / Renuga Veeran (second round)
 Shintaro Ikeda / Reiko Shiota (withdrew)
 Joe Wu / Danielle Barry (first round)

 James Eunson / Stephanie Cheng (second round)
 Michael Fowke / Susannah Leydon-Davis (first round)
 Yogendran Khrishnan / Anita Raj Kaur (quarterfinals)
 Glenn Warfe / Kate Wilson-Smith (quarterfinals)

Finals

References

External links
 Tournament link

Australian Open (badminton)
Australia
Badminton Australian Open
Australian Open